Gary Edwards may refer to:
Gary Edwards (ice hockey) (born 1947), Canadian ice hockey player
Gary Edwards (photographer) (born 1967), British photographer

See also
Garry Edwards (born 1950), Australian politician
Gareth Edwards (disambiguation)